The Swellhead is a 1930 American pre-Code sports film directed by James Flood and starring James Gleason, Johnnie Walker, and Marion Shilling. It is also known by the alternative title of Counted Out.

Cast
 James Gleason as Johnny Trump
 Johnnie Walker as Bill 'Cyclone' Hickey
 Marion Shilling as Mamie Judd
 Natalie Kingston as Barbara Larkin
 Paul Hurst as Mugsy
 Freeman Wood as Clive Warren
 Lillian Elliott as Mrs. Callahan

Preservation status
A copy is preserved in the Library of Congress collection.

References

External links
 
 

1930 films
1930s sports films
1930s English-language films
Films directed by James Flood
Tiffany Pictures films
American boxing films
American black-and-white films
1930s American films